Albert Edward Hall (21 January 1882 – 17 October 1957) was an English professional footballer who played for Aston Villa and England.

Career
Aston Villa signed Hall from Stourbridge in 1903. He scored six goals in his nine league outings in the 1903–04 season. He is noted as having been a hard working outside left player who teamed up well with Joe Bache between 1904 and 1910. Hall was a consistent goalscorer, scoring 61 goals in 214 league and cup appearances. In 1913 Hall left Villa to join Millwall and he retired in 1916.

Honours
With Villa, Hall won an FA Cup in 1905 and the First Division championship medal in 1910, the year when he won his first, and only, England cap in a game against Ireland.

References

Bibliography

External links

1882 births
1957 deaths
People from Wordsley
Association football wingers
England international footballers
Aston Villa F.C. players
Millwall F.C. players
English Football League players
English Football League representative players
English footballers
FA Cup Final players